Greenhead is a small suburb of the town of Wishaw, North Lanarkshire, Scotland.  It is situated to the south of Cambusnethan, and to the west of Waterloo.

Even though this part of Wishaw is mainly residential housing, Greenhead does have a few places of note, such as Cambusnethan Cemetery and Greenhead Moss Community Nature Park.

Since it is close to Wishaw Main Street, Greenhead has no shops. The suburb can be accessed either from the A721 or A722 roads.

Notable residents

Archibald Smith of Jordanhill FRSE (1813-1872)

References

External links
Greenhead Moss Community Nature Park

Areas of Wishaw